Belval may refer to:

Places in France
 Belval, Ardennes, in the Ardennes département 
 Belval, Manche, in the Manche département
 Belval, Vosges, in the Vosges département
 Belval-Bois-des-Dames, in the Ardennes département
 Belval-en-Argonne, in the Marne département 
 Belval-sous-Châtillon, in the Marne département

Places elsewhere
 Belval, Luxembourg, a neighbourhood of Esch-sur-Alzette, in south-western Luxembourg